Silvia Monti is an Italian actress.

She is mostly known for the female lead role as a mafioso's sister in the 1969 Gérard Oury caper film The Brain. In the movie she has a where she gets down from a balcony using a rope on a song by Caterina Caselli, Cento Giorni.

She stopped her career in 1974.

Selected filmography 
 Metti, una sera a cena (1969)
 Fräulein Doktor (1969)
 The Brain (1969)
 Queens of Evil (1970)
 A Lizard in a Woman's Skin (1971)
 Blackie the Pirate (1971)
 The Fifth Cord (1971)
 Lady Caroline Lamb (1972)
 The Sicilian Connection (1972)
 It Was I (1973)
 The Bloody Hands of the Law (1973)
 The Last Desperate Hours (1974)
 While There's War There's Hope (1974)
 Il domestico (1974)

External links
 

1946 births
Living people
Italian film actresses
Actors from Venice
20th-century Italian actresses
De Benedetti family